The Dominican Summer League Royals or DSL Royals are a minor league baseball team in the Dominican Summer League. The team plays in the Boca Chica Northwest division and is affiliated with the Kansas City Royals. The DSL Royals1 won the organization's first Dominican Summer league title in 2019. They did so by defeating the DSL D-Backs2 on Sept. 6, 1-0. There's also a DSL Royals2 team, as these two squads join seven other minor league organizations as Kansas City Royals affiliates.

History
The team first came into existence in 1989 as an independent Royals affiliate.  The following year, they shared an affiliation with the New York Mets.  In 1991, the team shared an affiliation with the Chicago Cubs, and an affiliation with the Colorado Rockies was added in 1992.  While the Cubs were dropped in 1993, the team would continue its joint affiliation with the Rockies until 1996.  In 1997, it once again became an independent affiliate of the Royals. In 2018, the Kansas City Royals were ranked the top educational program among all 30 MLB teams and their respective programs in the Dominican Republic, as voted by MLB.

Roster

References

External links
DSL Royals on SABR Minor Leagues Database

Dominican Summer League teams
Baseball teams in the Dominican Republic
Kansas City Royals minor league affiliates